The 2018 Tour of the Basque Country was a road cycling stage race that took place between 2 and 7 April 2018 in Spain. It was the 58th edition of the Tour of the Basque Country and the fourteenth event of the 2018 UCI World Tour.

The race was won by a Slovenian rider for the first time, as Primož Roglič was the most consistent rider over the course of the week. Aside from winning the individual time trial in Lodosa, Roglič finished second on three other stages, cementing the green jersey for the points classification alongside the txapela and yellow jersey for the general classification; Roglič won the race overall by over a minute from his next closest competitor, the 's Mikel Landa. Landa, and third-placed Ion Izagirre, had moved onto the overall podium on the race's penultimate stage, having been a part of a six-rider breakaway in the closing stages. The race's other jerseys were won by Spaniards Carlos Verona (mountains for ), and Enric Mas (young rider for  after a final-stage breakaway win), while the  won the teams classification as Nairo Quintana also finished in the top-five overall for the team.

Route
The full route of the 2018 Tour of the Basque Country was announced on 2 March 2018. For the first time in over 40 years, the race finished with a road stage and not an individual time trial.

Participating teams
As the Tour of the Basque Country was a UCI World Tour event, all eighteen UCI WorldTeams were invited automatically and were obliged to enter a team in the race. Four UCI Professional Continental teams were awarded wildcard places, bringing the number of teams to twenty-two. As each team included seven riders (down from eight in 2017), a total of 154 riders were due to start the first stage. However, 's Martijn Tusveld did not start, therefore reducing the peloton to 153 riders.

Stages

Stage 1
2 April 2018 — Zarautz to Zarautz,

Stage 2
3 April 2018 — Zarautz to Bermeo,

Stage 3
4 April 2018 — Bermeo to Villanueva de Valdegovía,

Stage 4
5 April 2018 — Lodosa to Lodosa, individual time trial (ITT)

Stage 5
6 April 2018 — Vitoria-Gasteiz to Eibar,

Stage 6
7 April 2018 — Eibar to Eibar–Arrate,

Classification leadership table
In the 2018 Tour of the Basque Country, four different jerseys were awarded. The general classification was calculated by adding each cyclist's finishing times on each stage. Introduced for the 2018 edition, time bonuses were awarded to the first three finishers on all stages except for the time trials: the stage winner won a ten-second bonus, with six and four seconds for the second and third riders respectively. Bonus seconds were also awarded to the first three riders at intermediate sprints; three seconds for the winner of the sprint, two seconds for the rider in second and one second for the rider in third. The leader of the general classification received a yellow jersey. This classification was considered the most important of the 2018 Tour of the Basque Country, and the winner of the classification was considered the winner of the race.

Additionally, there was a points classification, which awarded a green jersey, a change from white in 2017. In the points classification, cyclists received points for finishing in the top 15 in a stage. For winning a stage, a rider earned 25 points, with 20 for second, 16 for third, 14 for fourth, 12 for fifth, 10 for sixth with a point fewer per place down to a single point for 15th place. Points were also won in intermediate sprints; three points for crossing the sprint line first, two points for second place, and one for third.

There was also a mountains classification, for which points were awarded for reaching the top of a climb before other riders. Each of the twenty-three climbs were categorised as either first, second, or third-category, with more points available for the more difficult, higher-categorised climbs. For first-category climbs, the top six riders earned points; on second-category climbs, four riders won points; on third-category climbs, only the top three riders earned points. The leadership of the mountains classification was marked by a red jersey with white polka-dots.

Instead of the sprints classification, as it was in 2017, the fourth jersey represented the young rider classification, marked by a light blue jersey. Only riders born after 1 January 1993 were eligible; the young rider best placed in the general classification was the leader of the young rider classification. There was also a classification for teams, in which the times of the best three cyclists in a team on each stage were added together; the leading team at the end of the race was the team with the lowest cumulative time.

References

Sources

External links

2018
2018 UCI World Tour
2018 in Spanish road cycling
April 2018 sports events in Spain
2018 in the Basque Country (autonomous community)